Stardust Memories is a 1980 American comedy-drama film written and directed by Woody Allen and starring Allen, Charlotte Rampling, Jessica Harper and Marie-Christine Barrault. Sharon Stone has a brief role, in her film debut. The film is about a filmmaker who recalls his life and his loves - the inspirations for his films - while attending a retrospective of his work. The film is shot in black and white and is reminiscent of Federico Fellini's 8½ (1963), which it parodies.

Stardust Memories was nominated for a Writers Guild of America Award for Best Comedy written directly for screen, but was not warmly received by critics on its original release, and is not among the most renowned works in Allen's filmography. The film has nonetheless been re-evaluated to some extent, with modern reception more often positive than negative. Allen, who denies that the work is autobiographical and has expressed regret that audiences interpreted it as such, even considers it to be one of his finest, alongside The Purple Rose of Cairo and Match Point.

Plot
Sandy Bates is a director of comedy films. His latest film ends with a surreal sequence in which a character (played by Bates) is trapped on a train carriage surrounded by grotesque and unhappy figures. The character looks out the carriage window and sees another train filled with beautiful and happy people. Convinced he is on the wrong train, he tries unsuccessfully to get off the train before it speeds away. In the next scene, all the characters from the train wander aimlessly through an immense garbage dump. Bates’ character sees that the passengers from the other train have also ended up at the dump. Studio executives, having watched Bates’ film, complain that it is uncommercial and depressing. When this is conveyed to Bates, he insists that he no longer wants to make shallow comedy films, as this no longer feels honest to him.

Bates' managers remind him that he is scheduled to appear at a weekend-long retrospective of his films at the Stardust Hotel on the Jersey Shore. He is reluctant but agrees to attend. Through the weekend, Bates is haunted by memories of Dorrie, a former lover with mental illness issues. He recalls his first meeting with Dorrie on the set of one of his films, the blossoming of their relationship, and its later deterioration through a combination of her insecurities and his philandering. His last meeting with Dorrie takes place in a psychiatric hospital, where she is depressed and heavily medicated.

Arriving at the Stardust Hotel, Bates is swamped by fans, who often make bizarre or comical requests from him. He attends screenings of his films, and then submits to question and answer sessions. After the first session, he is invited to a nearby club by a young couple, Jack and Daisy, and he eagerly agrees. At the nightclub, Bates uses an instance of Jack’s absence to openly flirt with Daisy.

The following day, Bates’ current lover Isobel, a married mother of two, arrives at the hotel to join him. She announces that she has left her husband. Bates responds ambivalently to this news, but considers taking their relationship to the next level. Bates also meets with executives from his film studio, who have reshot the ending of his film, with the characters ending up in “jazz heaven”, instead of the garbage dump. Bates declares the idea to be idiotic, and refuses to accept it.

While talking with his agent on a public phone, Bates overhears Daisy talking about her sexual ambivalence towards Jack. Later, Bates organises an outing alone with Daisy. While the two are together, Bates' car breaks down and they are forced to continue on foot. They arrive at a large field, where they encounter a congregation of locals awaiting the appearance of flying saucers. During this encounter, Bates begins losing touch with reality, imagining or hallucinating various figures from his life and films, as well as a group of extraterrestrials (who advise him to continue making comedies). He finally imagines a psychotic fan who shoots him dead.

Actually having fainted in a panic attack, Bates fantasizes that he is given a posthumous award for his life’s work. He accepts the award in person, and tells the audience that the one moment in his life where he felt truly happy and fulfilled was on a sunny morning in his New York apartment, passing the time with Dorrie, reading and listening to Louis Armstrong’s version of “Stardust”. As Bates awakes from his fainting spell, he speaks Dorrie’s name, which angers Isobel, who has been waiting by his bedside. She attempts to break up with him, prompting him to abandon the retrospective and follow her onto her train. He passionately persuades her to forgive him, and they kiss as the train departs.

These events are observed by a film audience, which includes many figures who appear as characters in the film itself. As this film ends, they discuss its merits and flaws, and share their experiences of making it. As the audience departs the theater, a figure resembling Bates enters, retrieves his iconic sunglasses from a seat, and then exits.

Cast

Themes
Allen has asserted that Stardust Memories is not an autobiographical work. "[Critics] thought that the lead character was me," the director is quoted as saying in Woody Allen on Woody Allen. "Not a fictional character but me, and that I was expressing hostility towards my audience. That was in no way the point of the film. It was about a character who is obviously having a sort of nervous breakdown and, in spite of success, has come to a point in his life where he is having a bad time."

The conflict between the maternal, nurturing woman and the earnest, usually younger one, is a recurring theme in Allen's films. Like many of Allen's films, Stardust Memories incorporates several jazz recordings including those by such notables as Louis Armstrong, Django Reinhardt, and Chick Webb. The film's title alludes to the famous take of "Stardust" recorded in 1931 by Armstrong, wherein the trumpeter sings "oh, memory" three times in succession. However, it is the master take that plays in the movie during the sequence where Sandy is remembering the best moment of his life: looking at Dorrie while listening to Armstrong's recording of the song.

The film deals with issues regarding religion, God, and philosophy; especially existentialism, psychology, symbolism, wars and politics.  It is also about realism, relationships, and death.  It refers to many questions about the meaning of life. It also ruminates on the role that luck plays in life, a theme Allen would revisit in Match Point.

Production
Filming locations include:
 Asbury Park, New Jersey, USA
 Belmar, New Jersey, USA
 Deal, New Jersey, USA
 Hoboken, New Jersey, USA
 Neptune City, New Jersey, USA
 Ocean Grove, New Jersey, USA

From the sleevenotes of MGM's 2000 DVD release: "Shot on location in the fall of 1979, Stardust Memories may look as though it takes place in a Victorian-style seaside hotel, but it was actually shot at the Ocean Grove Great Auditorium and the Methodist Episcopal Conference Center and Concert Hall in New Jersey. Most of the interiors, including the bedroom scenes, were shot in a vacant Sears Roebuck building, but the crew also recreated a vintage train at Filmways Studio in Harlem. To reproduce the movement of a rail car, the whole train was mounted on jacks and gently jostled back and forth."

Reception
In Diane Jacobs' But We Need the Eggs: The Magic of Woody Allen, the director is quoted as saying: "shortly after Stardust Memories opened, John Lennon was shot by the very guy who had asked him for his autograph earlier in the day... This is what happens with celebrities: one day people love you; the next day they want to kill you."

Aggregator Rotten Tomatoes reports a 68% approval of Stardust Memories, with an average rating of 6.6/10 from 31 reviews. The website's critics consensus reads: "Woody Allen throws himself a pity party with all the surrealistic trimmings of Federico Fellini in Stardust Memories, a scabrous self-portrait that rankles as often as it impresses stylisticly." Janet Maslin wrote the work "is [Allen's] most provocative film thus far and perhaps his most revealing" and certainly "the one that will inspire the most heated debate". Roger Ebert gave the film two stars out of four and called it "a disappointment. It needs some larger idea, some sort of organizing force, to pull together all these scenes of bitching and moaning, and make them lead somewhere." Gene Siskel gave the film two-and-a-half stars out of four and suggested that Allen "seems to have run out of creative gas. The film doesn't have much of a premise." Gary Arnold of The Washington Post wrote that the film "has no dramatic shape or resonance, and the incidental laughs are few and far between." Charles Champlin of the Los Angeles Times was positive, calling the film "both extremely funny and extremely affecting ... Allen's growth as an actor and as a filmmaker in confident command of his medium is one of the several remarkable readouts from this film." Pauline Kael of The New Yorker wrote, "In 'Stardust Memories' we get more of the same thoughts over and over—it's like watching a loop. The material is fractured and the scenes are very short, but there was not a single one that I was sorry to see end. 'Stardust Memories' doesn't seem like a movie, or even like a filmed essay; it's nothing."

In a joint article, The Daily Telegraph film critics Robbie Collin and Tim Robey listed it as Allen's 10th greatest film and wrote; "slammed at the time, it's a retrospective knock-out, thanks to its ambitious structure, vinegary gags and the searing monochrome photography, courtesy of Gordon Willis". Sam Fragoso of IndieWire also ranked it among Allen's best works, lauding it as "an extraordinarily realized portrait of artistic stagnation". The film was listed 16th among Allen's efforts in a poll of Time Out contributors, with editor Joshua Rothkopf praising it as "a piece of self-referential hilarity in its own right."

In October 2013, Stardust Memories was voted by the Guardian readers as the eighth best film directed by Woody Allen.

Box office
Stardust Memories opened in North America on September 26, 1980 to an onslaught of bad reviews. At 29 theatres, it grossed $326,779 ($11,268 per screen) in its opening weekend. The film grossed $10,389,003 by the end of its run. The film's budget was $10 million.

Soundtrack
 "Hebrew School Rag" (Dick Hyman) by Dick Hyman
 "Just One of Those Things" (Cole Porter) by Dick Hyman
 "You'd Be So Easy to Love" (Cole Porter) by Dick Hyman
 "Tropical Mood Meringue" (Sidney Bechet) by Sidney Bechet
 "I'll See You in My Dreams" (Isham Jones and Gus Kahn) by Django Reinhardt
 "Tickletoe" (Lester Young) by Lester Young with Count Basie and His Orchestra
 "Three Little Words" (Harry Ruby, Bert Kalmar) by The Jazz Heaven Orchestra
 "Brazil" (Ary Barroso, S.K. Russell) by Marie Lane
 "Palesteena" (J. Russel Robinson and Con Conrad) by The Original Dixieland Jazz Band
 "Body and Soul" (Edward Heyman, Robert Sour, Johnny Green, and Frank Eyton) by Django Reinhardt
 "Night on Bald Mountain" (Modest Mussorgsky) by Vienna State Opera Orchestra
 "If Dreams Come True" (Irving Mills, Edgar M. Sampson, and Benny Goodman) by Chick Webb
 "Just One of Those Things" (Cole Porter) by Dick Hyman
 "You'd Be So Easy to Love" (Cole Porter) by Dick Hyman
 "One O'Clock Jump" (Count Basie) by The Jazz Heaven Orchestra
 "Sugar" (Maceo Pinkard and Sidney D. Mitchell)
 "Sweet Georgia Brown" (Ben Bernie, Kenneth Casey and Maceo Pinkard)
 "Moonlight Serenade" (Glenn Miller) by Glenn Miller
 "Stardust" (Hoagy Carmichael, Mitchell Parish) by Louis Armstrong

References

External links

 
 
 
 

1980 films
1980 comedy-drama films
American black-and-white films
American comedy-drama films
Films about film directors and producers
Films directed by Woody Allen
Films produced by Robert Greenhut
Films shot in New Jersey
Films with screenplays by Woody Allen
Midlife crisis films
United Artists films
1980s English-language films
1980s American films